The 2018 European Korfball Championship was held in the Netherlands from October 22 to October 30 - 8 days in total, with 10 national teams in competition. As the European Korfball Championship was split into an A-Championship and a B-Championship as of 2018, this tournament was used to decide which teams would participate at which level, with the top 8 teams qualifying for the A-Championship, while the teams in positions 9 and 10 relegated to the B-Championship. Netherlands won the tournament for a sixth consecutive time, maintaining its 100% win record.

Qualified teams

Group stage
The number of participating teams was brought down from 16 during the past two championships to only 10 in 2016, thus requiring a new format. Two groups (A and B) of five teams were drawn on 6 June 2016, with each team playing the other teams in their group once. The top two teams in these groups will move to the semi-finals. The other teams will also be paired with a team from the other group in a playoff match with the winners moving into group C playing for positions 5 through 7, while the playoff losers will go into group D playing for positions 8 through 10.

Group A

|}

Group B

|}

Knockout stage

Semi-finals

5th–10th place play-offs

Play-off round

|}

Group C
The three teams winning in the Play-off round will play each other in Group C to determine places 5 through 7.

Group D
The three teams losing in the Play-off round will play each other in Group D to determine places 8 through 10.

Final standing

Notes

External links
Official website

2016 IKF
2016 in korfball
2016 in Dutch sport
International sports competitions hosted by the Netherlands
Korfball in the Netherlands
October 2016 sports events in Europe